Renville County may be:

 Renville County, Minnesota
 Renville County, North Dakota